Peter Dula (born 15 November 1947) is a Kenyan boxer. He competed in the men's middleweight event at the 1972 Summer Olympics.

References

1947 births
Living people
Kenyan male boxers
Olympic boxers of Kenya
Boxers at the 1972 Summer Olympics
African Games gold medalists for Kenya
African Games medalists in boxing
Place of birth missing (living people)
Boxers at the 1973 All-Africa Games
Middleweight boxers
21st-century Kenyan people
20th-century Kenyan people